Jeff Byers (born September 7, 1985) is a former American football center who played in the National Football League. He played his college football for the University of Southern California.

High school career
Byers attended Loveland High School, where he participated in basketball, track and played competitive football.  In 2003, he played both offense and defense: That season, on defense as a defensive lineman, he had 203 tackles, 56 tackles for loss, 10 sacks, 14 forced fumbles and 3 fumble recoveries (with a touchdown).  On offense, as a center he recorded 34 pancake blocks in one game and never allowed a sack in his career.   Loveland won the Class 4A state championship in 2003.  He was named the 2004 Gatorade Player of the Year, as the nation's top high school football player.

College career

Although Byers arrived at USC as a center, the Trojans already had then-sophomore Ryan Kalil who kept the position for three seasons; as a result, he moved to left guard.  As a freshman, Byers started 4 and played in all 13 games during the 2004 season, as the Trojans went on to win the National Championship.

In the spring before the 2005 season, Byers had hip surgery and missed the entire season under a medical redshirt.  He started the 2006 season as a reserve in the opening game against Arkansas, but suffered a back sprain in subsequent week that required surgery.  He missed the rest of the season.

Byers recovered in time for the 2007 season, where he started all 13 games: 12 starts at left offensive guard and as center against Washington State University.  He missed most of the training camps the following spring after contracting Rocky Mountain spotted fever.  He was able to recover and was selected as a team captain for the 2008 season.  After starting all 12 regular season games, Byers was selected to the 2008 All-Pac-10 Second-team by conference coaches.

Due to the health issues that caused him to miss the 2005 and 2006 seasons, Byers petitioned the NCAA for a "clock-extension waiver".  In December 2008, the NCAA granted him an additional season of eligibility.

Byers received his bachelor's degree in business administration in the summer of 2007, he is currently studying under the Master of Business Administration program at the USC Marshall School of Business.  During the 2008 season, USC head coach Pete Carroll had Byers lecture the entire team on the subprime mortgage crisis.  He made the 2007 Pac-10 All-Academic second-team.

In 2009, Byers was listed at No. 1 on Rivals.com′s preseason interior lineman power ranking in 2009.

With the injury of starting center Kristofer O'Dowd, Byers was moved to starting center for the Trojans 2009 season opener against San Jose State.

Professional career

2010 NFL Draft

Undrafted in the 2010 NFL Draft, Byers was signed by his former college coach, Pete Carroll, to the Seattle Seahawks on April 30, 2010, but cut before the start of the season.  Byers was then added to the Denver Broncos practice squad on September 6, 2010.  Byers was activated by the Broncos in December 2010, but released the following summer. Following his release by the Broncos, Byers was added to the Panthers' practice squad on September 5, 2011. He was promoted to the Panthers' active roster on December 17, 2011. Byers announced his retirement on March 11, 2014.

References

External links
USC Athletic Department Biography: Jeff Byers

1985 births
Living people
American football offensive linemen
Carolina Panthers players
Denver Broncos players
People from Loveland, Colorado
Players of American football from Colorado
Seattle Seahawks players
USC Trojans football players